Willy Unger (27 March 1920 – 23 June 2005) was a Luftwaffe ace and recipient of the Knight's Cross of the Iron Cross during World War II.

Career
Willy Unger was born on 27 March 1920 in Warstein. Already as a teenager, he became a skilled glider pilot. In September 1939 he joined the Luftwaffe and was accepted as an aircraft mechanic (Flugzeugmechaniker) in spite of his qualifications as pilot. Only in early 1943 Unger began his training as a fighter pilot, being incorporated into the I./Jagdgeschwader 104 (JG 104—104th Fighter Wing). In December 1943 when he completing his training was promoted to Unteroffizier.

In defense of the Reich
In January 1944, Unger was posted to IV. Gruppe of Jagdgeschwader 3 "Udet" (JG 3—3rd Fighter Wing). On 26 February, just after the United States Army Air Forces (USAAF) and the Royal Air Force (RAF) Bomber Command finished "Big Week", IV. Gruppe moved from Venlo in the Netherlands to Salzwedel in central Germany. At Salzwedel, the Gruppe was joined by Sturmstaffel 1, headed by Major Hans-Günter von Kornatzki. The Sturmstaffel was an experimental unit flying the so-called Sturmböcke (battering ram) up-gunned Focke-Wulf Fw 190 A-7 and A-8 aircraft in Defense of the Reich.

On 11 April, Unger claimed his first aerial victories. At the time, he was assigned to 11. Staffel (11th squadron) of JG 3 commanded by Oberleutnant Otto Wessling. That day, the USAAF attacked the German aircraft industry in Oschersleben, Bernburg, Sorau, Cottbus and Arnimswalde, present-day Goleniów, with 917 heavy bombers escorted by 819 fighter aircraft. The Gruppe was scrambled at 10:05 with the order to unite with other Luftwaffe units of the 1. Jagd Division (1st Fighter Division) and 3. Jagd Division (3rd Fighter Division) over the Brocken. Between 10:00 and 10:30, the Luftwaffe fighters intercepted the USAAF bombers between Braunschweig and Halberstadt. During this aerial battle, Unger claimed a bomber shot down. Because the claim was not witnessed, he was not credited with the aerial victory. Following this mission, the Luftwaffe fighters were refueled and rearmed and were scrambled a second time at 12:40. The returning bombers were intercepted south of Rostock. Flying his fourth combat mission of the war, Unger was credited with a Boeing B-17 Flying Fortress shot down.

Two days later, the USAAF Eighth Air Force attacked the ball-bearing factories of Schweinfurt, the Messerschmitt factory at Augsburg, the Dornier factory at Oberpfaffenhofen and the Luftwaffe Lechfeld Airfield. IV. Gruppe attacked the third wave of bombers near Aschaffenburg in a frontal attack. During this attack, Unger shot down a B-17 bomber. On 15 April, General der Jagdflieger Adolf Galland visited IV. Gruppe at Salzwedel and announced that the Gruppe was to be converted to a Sturmgruppe following the example of Sturmstaffel 1. In consequence, the Sturmgruppe was placed under the command of Hauptmann Wilhelm Moritz and 11. Staffel was merged with the experimental Sturmstaffel 1 and renamed to 11. Sturmstaffel and placed under the command of Oberleutnant Werner Gerth after Weßling was killed in action on 19 April. On 18, the USAAF Eighth Air Force headed for industrial targets near Berlin. The USAAF 3rd Bombardment Division was intercepted in the area Rathenow and Nauen. During the course of a 20 minutes aerial battle, Unger claimed two B-17 bombers shot down. The following day, the USAAF Eighth Air Force attacked the German aircraft manufacturing and aircraft engine industry as well as various Luftwaffe airfields in Westphalia and Hesse. IV. Gruppe took off at 09:30 and met up with the other two Gruppen of JG 3 near Göttingen and Kassel. During this mission, Unger shot down a B-17. The USAAF Eighth Air Force sent 803 heavy bombers to attack transportation infrastructure in western Germany, including the marshalling yard at Hamm. IV. Gruppe was scrambled at 18:20 and intercepted the bombers of the 2nd Bombardment Division at 19:40. In this encounter, the four aerial victories. This number includes an Herausschuss (separation shot)—a severely damaged heavy bomber forced to separate from its combat box which was counted as an aerial victory—over a Consolidated B-24 Liberator bomber.

On 24 April, the USAAF sent its bombers to the German aircraft industry located in southern Germany. At 13:30, Luftwaffe units intercepted the bombers west of Munich. In this encounter, Unger was credited with an aerial victory over a B-17 bomber. The USAAF Eighth Air Force flew its next daylight mission on 29 April, attacking Berlin with 679 heavy bombers of which 618 reached the target area. IV. Gruppe was scrambled at 10:10 and the bombers were first sighted in the area of Magdeburg. Although the bombers were protected by escorting fighters, IV. Gruppe flew two frontal attacks. The Luftwaffe pilots claimed twelve aerial victories and nine Herausschüsse, including one by Unger, for the loss of five Fw 190 fighters damaged in combat.

On 8 May 1944 he was shot down by defensive fire from one of the B-17s, but managed to make a gear-up landing in his Messerschmitt Bf 109 G-6 at Uelzen. Awarded the Ehrenpokal der Luftwaffe on 21 June 1944, Unger hit two B-24 Liberator over the town of Oschersleben on 7 July 1944, claiming his 10th and 11th victories. In total, Luftwaffe pilots claimed the destruction of 60 bombers while actual losses were 28 bombers destroyed and further bombers returned with various levels of combat damage. The authors Prien, Stemmer and Bock state that the consolidated attack flown in close formation by the Sturmgruppe resulted in overclaiming of aerial victories caused by the confusing combat situation. During these attacks, multiple pilots may have simultaneously fired at the same bomber. It was therefore unclear who was responsible for the destruction of the bomber.

On 3 August 1944, he shot down two further B-24s, but his Fw 190 A-8 was hit again, forcing him to abandon his aircraft. In August 1944 Unger vas awarded the German Cross in Gold. On 23 October 1944, when he had accounted for a total of 19 four-engine bombers, the Fahnenjunker-Oberfeldwebel Unger was awarded the Knight's Cross of the Iron Cross. Unger was promoted to Leutnant (second lieutenant) in December 1944.

Eastern Front and end of war
On 12 January 1945, Soviet forces launched the Vistula–Oder offensive advancing into German-held territory, capturing Kraków, Warsaw and Poznań on the Eastern Front. In consequence, on 21 January, IV. With this transfer, the Sturmgruppe came under the control of the 1. Flieger-Division (1st Air Division), commanded by Generalmajor Robert Fuchs, and subordinated to II. Fliegerkorps (2nd Air Corps), headed by General der Flieger Martin Fiebig. The following day, Unger was appointed Staffelkapitän (squadron leader) of 14. Sturmstaffel of JG 3, succeedin Oberleutnant Karl-Heinz von den Steinen who was transferred. Over the next weeks, the Sturmgruppe predominantly flew fighter-bomber missions in support of German ground forces retreating towards the Oder.

On 19 February, the Sturmgruppe flew ground support missions south of Stargard near the Oder. During this mission, Luftwaffe pilots claimed five aerial victories, including a Bell P-39 Airacobra fighter aircraft by Unger. On 15 March, the Sturmgruppe flew multiple combat missions to combat area near Stettin. During these missions, Unger shot down two Petlyakov Pe-2 bombers. On 2 April, Unger left for Brandenburg-Briest when he was transferred to Jagdgeschwader 7 "Nowotny" (JG 7—7th Fighter Wing) operating the revolutionary Messerschmitt Me 262 jet fighter without claiming further aerial victories. He was succeeded by Leutnant Herbert Bareuther as commander of 14. Sturmstaffel of JG 3.

Unger died on 23 June 2005 in the town of Warstein, at 85 years of age.

Summary of career

Aerial victory claims
According to Forsyth, Unger was credited with 24 aerial victories, including 21 heavy bombers. Obermaier lists Unger with 22 aerial victories, including 19 heavy bombers and three on the Eastern Front, claimed in 59 combat missions. Mathews and Foreman, authors of Luftwaffe Aces — Biographies and Victory Claims, researched the German Federal Archives and found records for 21 aerial victory claims, plus three further unconfirmed claim. This figure includes three aerial victories on the Eastern Front and 18 Western Allies heavy bombers.

Victory claims were logged to a map-reference (PQ = Planquadrat), for example "PQ 15 Ost S/UE-3". These sectors were then subdivided into 36 smaller units to give a location area 3 × 4 km in size.

Awards
 Flugzeugführerabzeichen
 Front Flying Clasp of the Luftwaffe in Silver
 Iron Cross (1939) 2nd and 1st Class
 Wound Badge in Black (8 May 1944)
 Honour Goblet of the Luftwaffe (21 June 1944)
 German Cross in Gold in August 1944 as Fahnenjunker-Feldwebel in the 12./Jagdgeschwader 3
 Knight's Cross of the Iron Cross on 23 October 1944 as Fahnenjunker-Feldwebel and pilot in the IV.(Sturm)/Jagdgeschwader 3 "Udet"

Notes

References

Citations

Bibliography

External links
Luftwaffe 1939–1945 History
Aces of the Luftwaffe

1920 births
2005 deaths
People from Warstein
People from the Province of Westphalia
Luftwaffe pilots
German World War II flying aces
Recipients of the Gold German Cross
Recipients of the Knight's Cross of the Iron Cross
German prisoners of war in World War II held by the United States
Military personnel from North Rhine-Westphalia